Clethrobius is a genus of true bugs belonging to the family Aphididae.

The genus was first described by Mordvilko in 1928.

The species of this genus are found in Europe.

Species include:
 Clethrobius comes (Walker, 1848)

References

Aphididae